Pine Grove is an unincorporated community in Pleasants County, West Virginia, United States.

Unincorporated communities in Pleasants County, West Virginia
Unincorporated communities in West Virginia